Qalebi-ye Olya (also Romanized as Qālebī-ye ‘Olyā; also known as Qālebī) is a village in Veysian Rural District, Veysian District, Dowreh County, Lorestan Province, Iran. In the 2006 census, its population was measured at 392, with 97 families.

References 

Towns and villages in Dowreh County